Fort St. Nicholas may refer to:
, Marseille, France
, New France (modern Wisconsin, United States)
Fort Saint Nicholas, Rhodes, Greece
Fort Nikolaevskaia, Alaska, United States